Vladimir Semyonovich Lyubarov (born  September 4, 1944, Moscow) is a Russian painter and graphic artist. Member of the Russian Union of Artists since 1985.

References

External links
 

1944 births
Living people
Soviet painters
Artists from Moscow